The 1999 Big 12 Conference women's basketball tournament was held March 2–6, 1999, at Municipal Auditorium in Kansas City, MO.

Number 1 seed  defeated 2 seed  73-59 to win their 2nd championship and receive the conference's automatic bid to the 1999 NCAA tournament.

Seeding
The Tournament consisted of a 12 team single-elimination tournament with the top 4 seeds receiving a bye.

Schedule

Tournament

All-Tournament team
Most Outstanding Player – Angie Braziel, Texas Tech

See also
1999 Big 12 Conference men's basketball tournament
1999 NCAA Division I women's basketball tournament
1998–99 NCAA Division I women's basketball rankings

References

Big 12 Conference women's basketball tournament
Tournament
Big 12 Conference women's basketball tournament
Big 12 Conference women's basketball tournament